Deramas livens  is a butterfly in the family Lycaenidae. It was described by William Lucas Distant in 1886. It is found in the Indomalayan realm.

Subspecies
D. l. livens Peninsular Malaya, Thailand, Sumatra, Borneo
D. l. evansi  Eliot, 1964 Burma (Tenasserim, Mergui)

References

External links
Deramas at Markku Savela's Lepidoptera and Some Other Life Forms

Deramas
Butterflies described in 1886